The 1994–95 QMJHL season was the 26th season in the history of the Quebec Major Junior Hockey League. The QMJHL unveils an updated logo one season after its special 25th anniversary logo, using a stylized ice skate and the letters of the league's French acronym. The season also marked the first expansion by the QMJHL into Atlantic Canada, with the addition of the Halifax Mooseheads.

Several of the league's trophies are renamed, as corporate sponsorships expire. The Shell Cups are renamed the Ford Cups, one each for the offensive and defensive players of the year. The Transamerica Plaque is renamed the AutoPro Plaque, and the Molson Cup is renamed the New Faces Cup.

Thirteen teams played 72 games each in the schedule. The Laval Titan Collège Français finished first overall in the regular season, for their second consecutive Jean Rougeau Trophy, and made their third consecutive appearance in the finals. The Hull Olympiques won their third President's Cup, defeating Laval 4 games to 1.

Team changes
 The Halifax Mooseheads join the league as an expansion franchise, playing in the Dilio Division.
 Verdun Collège Français cease operations. The Collège Français transfers its sponsorship to the Laval Titan.
 The Laval Titan are renamed the Laval Titan Collège Français.

Final standings
Note: GP = Games played; W = Wins; L = Losses; T = Ties; Pts = Points; GF = Goals for; GA = Goals against

Complete list of standings.

Scoring leaders
Note: GP = Games played; G = Goals; A = Assists; Pts = Points; PIM = Penalty minutes

 Complete scoring statistics.

Playoffs
Sebastien Bordeleau was the leading scorer of the playoffs with 32 points (13 goals, 19 assists).

First round
 Laval Titan Collège Français defeated Victoriaville Tigres 4 games to 0.
 Beauport Harfangs defeated Halifax Mooseheads 4 games to 3.
 Hull Olympiques defeated Saint-Hyacinthe Laser 4 games to 1.
 Shawinigan Cataractes defeated Drummondville Voltigeurs 4 games to 0.
 Granby Bisons defeated Saint-Jean Lynx 4 games to 3.
 Chicoutimi Saguenéens defeated Sherbrooke Faucons 4 games to 3.

Quarterfinals
Note: GP = Games played; W = Wins; L = Losses; T = Ties; Pts = Points; GF = Goals for; GA = Goals against

Semifinals
 Laval Titan Collège Français defeated Shawinigan Cataractes 4 games to 1.
 Hull Olympiques defeated Beauport Harfangs 4 games to 1.

Finals
 Hull Olympiques defeated Laval Titan Collège Français 4 games to 1.

All-star teams
First team
 Goaltender - Eric Fichaud, Chicoutimi Saguenéens
 Left defence - Charles Paquette, Sherbrooke Faucons
 Right defence - Stephane Julien, Sherbrooke Faucons
 Left winger - Patrick Carignan, Shawinigan Cataractes
 Centreman - Sebastien Bordeleau, Hull Olympiques
 Right winger - Eric Daze, Beauport Harfangs
 Coach - Michel Therrien, Laval Titan Collège Français

Second team
 Goaltender - Jose Theodore, Saint-Jean Lynx / Hull Olympiques
 Left defence - Alain Nasreddine, Chicoutimi Saguenéens
 Right defence - Christian Laflamme, Beauport Harfangs
 Left winger - Brant Blackned, Halifax Mooseheads
 Centreman - Steve Brûlé, Saint-Jean Lynx
 Right winger - Frederic Chartier, Laval Titan Collège Français
 Coach - Claude Therien, Saint-Jean Lynx

Rookie team
 Goaltender - Martin Biron, Beauport Harfangs
 Left defence - Anders Myrvold, Laval Titan Collège Français
 Right defence - Radoslav Suchy, Sherbrooke Faucons
 Left winger - Denis Hamel, Chicoutimi Saguenéens
 Centreman - Danny Briere, Drummondville Voltigeurs
 Right winger - Daniel Corso, Victoriaville Tigres
 Coach - Robert Mongrain, Hull Olympiques
 List of First/Second/Rookie team all-stars.

Trophies and awards
Team
President's Cup - Playoff Champions, Hull Olympiques
Jean Rougeau Trophy - Regular Season Champions, Laval Titan Collège Français
Robert Lebel Trophy - Team with best GAA, Beauport Harfangs

Player
Michel Brière Memorial Trophy - Most Valuable Player, Frederic Chartier, Laval Titan Collège Français
Jean Béliveau Trophy - Top Scorer, Patrick Carignan, Shawinigan Cataractes
Guy Lafleur Trophy - Playoff MVP, Jose Theodore, Hull Olympiques
Ford Cup – Offensive - Offensive Player of the Year, Sebastien Bordeleau, Hull Olympiques
Ford Cup – Defensive - Defensive Player of the Year, Jose Theodore, Hull Olympiques
AutoPro Plaque - Best plus/minus total, Frederic Chartier, Laval Titan Collège Français
Jacques Plante Memorial Trophy - Best GAA, Martin Biron, Beauport Harfangs
Emile Bouchard Trophy - Defenceman of the Year, Stephane Julien, Sherbrooke Faucons
Mike Bossy Trophy - Best Pro Prospect, Martin Biron, Beauport Harfangs
New Faces Cup - Rookie of the Year, Steve Brûlé, Saint-Jean Lynx
Michel Bergeron Trophy - Offensive Rookie of the Year, Danny Briere, Drummondville Voltigeurs
Raymond Lagacé Trophy - Defensive Rookie of the Year, Martin Biron, Beauport Harfangs
Frank J. Selke Memorial Trophy - Most sportsmanlike player, Eric Daze, Beauport Harfangs
QMJHL Humanitarian of the Year - Humanitarian of the Year, David-Alexandre Beauregard, Saint-Hyacinthe Laser
Marcel Robert Trophy - Best Scholastic Player, Danny Briere, Drummondville Voltigeurs
Paul Dumont Trophy - Personality of the Year, Eric Daze, Beauport Harfangs

Executive
Ron Lapointe Trophy - Coach of the Year, Michel Therrien, Laval Titan Collège Français
John Horman Trophy - Executive of the Year, Jean Nadeau, Shawinigan Cataractes
St-Clair Group Plaque - Marketing Director of the Year, Yvon Rioux, Val D'Or Foreurs

See also
1995 Memorial Cup
1995 NHL Entry Draft
1994–95 OHL season
1994–95 WHL season

References
 Official QMJHL Website
 www.hockeydb.com/

Quebec Major Junior Hockey League seasons
QMJHL